Flax neptun is a moth of the family Erebidae first described by Michael Fibiger in 2011. It is found in Indonesia (eastern Bali).

The wingspan is about 10.5 mm. The forewings and fringes are light brown. There is a black quadrangular patch in the upper medial area with a ventro-basal small black dot. The base of the costa is black, subapically with small brown dots. The crosslines are indistinct; except the brown subterminal line. The terminal lines are indicated by dark-brown interveinal dots. The hindwings are grey with an indistinct discal spot. The underside of the forewings is unicolorous brown and the underside of the hindwings is grey with an indistinct discal spot.

References

Micronoctuini
Moths described in 2011
Taxa named by Michael Fibiger